Balcarres may refer to:

Balcarres, Saskatchewan, Canada
Balcarres House, Fife, Scotland
Earl of Balcarres